Hurupaki Mountain is in Kamo, Whangārei, New Zealand.  The centre of Hurupaki Mountain lies between Three Mile Bush Road and Dip Road, approximately 1.5 kilometres west of Kamo township.  Hurupaki Mountain is visible from State Highway 1.

Characteristics

Hurupaki Mountain is a high scoria cone whose associated basalt lava has been dated at 310,000 years old. It is part of the Puhipuhi-Whangarei volcanic field. This volcanic area is similar to the Auckland volcanic field in that it has formed over a type of hot spot in the mantle, i.e. not at a current plate boundary.

The Whangārei field is older than the Auckland field, and Hurupaki is probably one of the younger centres. There is another basaltic field in Northland, the Kaikohe-Bay of Islands volcanic field, which also has some young scoria cones and lava flows. Both of these Northland fields are older than the Auckland field.

Hurupaki Mountain is a steep sided, partly bush-covered scoria cone. One quarry exposes an eruption sequence showing that magma variation occurred during eruption. The east side shows an excellent example of a young scoria cone. This is the easternmost cone of a group of three centres: (east to west) Hurupaki, Rawhitiroa (height ) and Ngararatunua (height ).

Pre-European history

Hurupaki is a Māori word and means to cover with a cloak. Hurupaki Mountain was once a large Māori pa with a considerable number of pits and terraces. When occupied, the pa would have been clear of trees.  The slopes of the hill were terraced to provide flat areas on which to build houses, construct storage pits and as general living areas.

The pa has about 70 pits on it; most of these were probably used as underground storage for kumara and berries, grown on the slopes of the hill. Some of the shallow pits and terraces would have had whares built on them.

The Maori chief, Pohe, had his pa on the mountain, and was chief of most of the area within the Whangarei district, as so claimed by his descendants. He was the right-hand man of Hone Heke, and was trusted by Heke to fulfil his role as guardian of the Whangarei Harbour and Kamo West area, known as Nga-rara-i-tunua.

Present day
Today Hurupaki Mountain is partly farmed (cows and sheep).  There is also a small pine tree plantation and the rest is in native bush.  There is public access to the top of the mountain, although there is no viewing platform at the top.

References
Inventory of Quaternary volcanoes and volcanic features of Northland, Auckland, South Auckland and Taranaki / by L.O. Kermode ... [et al.]
Kamo the story of a village.  Compiled by Diana Menefy

Volcanoes of the Northland Region
Whangārei